Macalister is a rural town and locality in the Western Downs Region, Queensland, Australia.

Geography
The locality is located in the Darling Downs and the town is in centre of the locality.

The Warrego Highway enters the locality from the south-east (Dalby), passes through the town, and exits to the north-west (Warra).

The Western railway line runs immediately parallel and north of the highway, with three railway stations in the locality (from west to east):

 Broadmead railway station (now abandoned) in the north-west of the locality
 Macalister railway station, serving the town
 Apunyal railway station (now abandoned) in the south-east of the locality

There are two neighbourhoods in Macalister arising from these railway stations:

 Broadmead in the north-west of the locality
Apunyal in the south-east of the locality

History
The town is named after Arthur Macalister, Premier of Queensland from 1866 to 1867.

The name Apunyal is an Aboriginal word meaning large plain.

Macalister Post Office opened on 1 July 1880 (a receiving office had been open from 1876, known as Jimbour Creek until 1878) and closed in 1980.

Ranges Bridge Provisional School opened circa 1886 and closed in June 1894. The school building was then relocated and reopened as Macalister Provisional School on 27 August 1894. On 1 January 1909 it  became Macalister State School. In 1913, it was renamed Apunyal State School. It closed circa 1935.

A second separate Macalister State School opened in 1913 (the first one having been renamed Apunyal). It closed on 4 May 1973. The school was on the Warrego Highway.

At the 2006 census, Macalister and the surrounding area had a population of 486.

Education 
There are no schools in Macalister. The nearest primary schools are Jimbour State School in neighbouring Jimbour East to the north-east, Warra State School in neighbouring Warra to the north-west, Dalby State School in neighbouring Dalby to the south-east and Kogan State School in neighbouring Kogan to the west. The nearest secondary schools are Jandowae State School (to Year 10) in Jandowae to the north and Dalby State High School (to Year 12) in Dalby.

Amenities 
The Redeemer Lutheran Church is at 20647 Warrego Highway.

The Macalister branch of the Queensland Country Women's Association meets at the Kenmore Library at the QCWA Hall at 20649 Warrego Highway.

References

External links

 

Towns in Queensland
Western Downs Region
Localities in Queensland